This article lists the winners and nominees for the Black Reel Award for Outstanding Actor in an Independent Film. This award was first given in 2002, before being retired during the 2006 ceremony.

Winners and nominees
Winners are listed first and highlighted in bold.

2000s

References

Black Reel Awards